The Pilate stone is a damaged block (82 cm x 65 cm) of carved limestone with a partially intact inscription attributed to, and mentioning, Pontius Pilate, a prefect of the Roman province of Judea from AD 26 to 36. It was discovered at the archaeological site of Caesarea Maritima in 1961. The artifact is particularly significant because it is an archaeological find of an authentic 1st-century Roman inscription mentioning the name "[Pont]ius Pilatus".  It is contemporary to Pilate's lifetime, and accords with what is known of his reported career.  In effect, the inscription constitutes the earliest surviving, and only contemporary, record of Pilate, who is otherwise known from the New Testament and apocryphal texts, the Jewish historian Josephus and writer Philo, and brief references by Roman historians such as Tacitus.

It is likely that Pontius Pilate made his base at Caesarea Maritima – the site where the stone was discovered, since that city had replaced Jerusalem as the administrative capital and military headquarters of the province in AD 6, Pilate probably travelled to Jerusalem, the central city of the province's Jewish population, only when necessary.

The Pilate stone is currently located at the Israel Museum in Jerusalem. Plaster-cast replicas can be found at the Archaeological Museum in Milan, Italy, and on display in Caesarea Maritima itself.

Inscription
On the partially damaged block is a dedication to the deified Augustus and Livia (the Augustan gods or "Divine Augusti"), the stepfather and mother of emperor Tiberius, originally placed within a Tiberieum, probably a temple dedicated to Tiberius. It has been deemed authentic because it was  discovered in the coastal town of Caesarea, which was the capital of Iudaea Province during the time Pontius Pilate was Roman governor.

The partial inscription reads (conjectural letters in brackets):
[DIS AUGUSTI]S TIBERIÉUM
[...PONTI]US PILATUS
[...PRAEF]ECTUS IUDA[EA]E
[...FECIT D]E[DICAVIT]
The translation from Latin to English for the inscription reads:
To the Divine Augusti [this] Tiberieum
...Pontius Pilate
...prefect of Judea
...has dedicated [this]

Discovery

The limestone block was discovered in June 1961 by Italian archaeologist Maria Teresa Fortuna Canivet during a campaign led by Dr. Antonio Frova while excavating in the area of an ancient theatre built by decree of Herod the Great around 22–10 BC, along with the entire city of Caesarea.

The artifact is a fragment of the dedicatory inscription of a later building, probably a temple, that was constructed, possibly in honour of the emperor Tiberius, dating to AD 26 to 36.

The stone was then reused in the 4th century as a building block for a set of stairs belonging to a structure erected behind the stage house of the Herodian theatre, and it was discovered there, still attached to the ancient staircase, by the archaeologists.

References

External links

 
 Inscription Caes. 43 at the Inscriptions of Israel-Palestine project, Michael Satlow et al. Brown University (2019), including transcription and photographs

1st century in the Roman Empire
1st-century Latin texts
1st-century inscriptions
1961 archaeological discoveries
Jews and Judaism in the Roman Empire
Archaeological artifacts
Early Christianity-related inscriptions
Latin inscriptions
Pontius Pilate